Denarius Earl Moore (born December 9, 1988) is a former American football wide receiver. He was drafted by the Oakland Raiders in the fifth round of the 2011 NFL Draft. He played college football at Tennessee.

Early years
Born Darnius Earl Moore, Denarius Moore legally changed his first name when he was a senior in high school. He attended Tatum High School in Tatum, Texas, where he was a letterman in football, track and basketball. In football, he was coached by Andy Evans. As junior, he totaled 27 receptions for 423 yards and eight touchdowns, while also adding 287 rushing yards with two touchdowns on the ground. As senior, he caught 32 passes for 501 yards and rushed 27 times for more than 200 yards. He was named twice Class 2A Texas sportswriters first-team All-State as a kickoff returner, Second-team Reebok Super Team as a cornerback and was an PrepStar All-America. In basketball, he was the starting point guard, and averaged 20.1 points per game.

Moore also competed in track & field while at Tatum, where he was one of the state's top performers in the hurdling events. He captured two state titles at the 2006 TX State 3A, winning the 110-meter hurdles, with a time of 13.73 seconds, and the 300-meter hurdles, with a time of 37.33 seconds. In 2007, he set a new school record in the 110-metres hurdles event by clocking a 13.69 at the TX State 2A OUT, on his way to another state title win. In that same meet, he took gold in the 300-metres hurdles, with a PR of 36.99 seconds, and also earned a second-place finish in the long jump, recording a career-best jump of 7.25 meters. He was also a member of the Tatum 4 × 400 m relay squad.

Professional career

2011 NFL Draft

Oakland Raiders
Moore was drafted by the Oakland Raiders in the 5th round with the (148th pick overall) of the 2011 NFL Draft. After a strong Training camp and Preseason, Moore made the Oakland Raiders 53-man Roster.

In just his second career game, Moore exploded against the Buffalo Bills in Week 2 of the 2011 NFL Season, making spectacular catches over the course of the game recording 146 yards on 5 catches and scoring a 50-yard touchdown on a pass from Quarterback Jason Campbell while also adding one rush for 25 yards.

After a very successful first three seasons in Oakland, Moore's playing time fell off in the 2014 season, recording only 115 yards on twelve receptions and no touchdowns.

Cincinnati Bengals
On April 6, 2015, Moore signed one-year deal with the Cincinnati Bengals. Moore was released by the Bengals on August 31, 2015, as part of the first wave of roster cuts for the preseason.

Buffalo Bills
On October 7, 2015, Moore signed with the Buffalo Bills. On November 25, 2015, he was released.

References

External links
Oakland Raiders bio
Tennessee Volunteers bio

1988 births
Living people
Players of American football from Texas
People from Tatum, Texas
American football wide receivers
Tennessee Volunteers football players
Oakland Raiders players
Cincinnati Bengals players
Buffalo Bills players